In telecommunication, a password length parameter is a basic parameter the value of which affects password strength against brute force attack and so is a contributor to computer security. 

The degree of password security is determined by the probability that a password can be guessed in its lifetime.

See also
Key stretching
Password cracking

References

Computer network security
Password authentication